HD 175541 b is a jovian planet  located approximately 424 light-years away in the constellation of Serpens, orbiting the star HD 175541. This planet was discovered in April 2007. Despite the distance of planet to star slightly more than Earth to the Sun, the period is less than 300 days that orbits in an eccentric orbit, because the parent star is 65% more massive than the Sun.

The planet HD 175541 b is called Kavian. The name was selected in the NameExoWorlds campaign by Iran, during the 100th anniversary of the IAU. Kaveh (name of the star HD 175541) carries a banner called Derafsh Kaviani in the Shahnameh.

The discovery of this planet and two others: HD 192699 b and HD 210702 b around intermediate-mass stars provide clues about the formation and  history of migration of planets around the A-type stars.

References

External links
 

Exoplanets discovered in 2007
Giant planets
Serpens (constellation)
Exoplanets detected by radial velocity
Exoplanets with proper names